The Vineyard is a Spanish romantic drama television limited series produced by Atresmedia Studios and Boomerang TV for Amazon Prime Video starring Leonor Watling, Rafael Novoa, Emilio Gutiérrez Caba and Juana Acosta. It is an adaptation of the novel of the same name by María Dueñas. It was released on 26 March 2021.

Premise 
Set in the 1860s, the fiction moves across different locations such as London, Cuba, Cádiz and Mexico. The plot tracks the love story between Mauro Larrea (Rafael Novoa) and Soledad Montalvo (Leonor Watling), a refined woman belonging to a noted winemaking family from Jerez.

Cast 
 Leonor Watling as Soledad Montalvo
 Carla Campra as young Soledad Montalvo
 Rafael Novoa as Mauro Larrea
 Juana Acosta as Carola Gorostiza
 Emilio Gutiérrez Caba as Don Matías Montalvo
 Esmeralda Pimentel as Mariana Larrea
 Nathaniel Parker as Edward Clayton
 Alejandro de la Madrid as Elías Andrade
 Raúl Briones as Santos Huesos
 Ignacio Mateos as Luis el Comino
 Javier Beltrán as Gustavo Zayas
 Henry Pettigrew as Alan Clayton
 Bella Agossou as Trinidad.
 Jose Roberto Diaz as Ernesto Gorostiza (Episode 2)

Production and release 
It was shot in Tenerife, Madrid, Dublin, London and Jerez. In February 2021, Amazon Prime Video disclosed the intended release date set for 26 March 2021. Guillem Morales, Alberto Ruiz Rojo and Patricia Font directed the episodes, whereas Sonia Martínez, Nacho Manubens, Tedy Villalba and José María Caro are credited as executive producers. The screenplay adapting the original novel by María Dueñas was authored by Susana López Rubio and Javier Holgado. The series consists of 10 episodes with a running time of around 50 minutes.

References 

2020s Spanish drama television series
2021 Spanish television series debuts
Television shows set in Andalusia
Television shows set in Mexico
Cuba in fiction
Television shows set in London
Television shows filmed in Spain
Television series set in the 1860s
Spanish-language Amazon Prime Video original programming
2020s romantic drama television series
Television series based on Spanish novels
Spanish-language television shows
Television series by Boomerang TV
Television series by Buendía Estudios